Walk Hard: The Dewey Cox Story – Original Motion Picture Soundtrack is the soundtrack to the 2007 film Walk Hard: The Dewey Cox Story.

Production

The cast and crew recorded 40 original songs; 33 are featured in the movie. Singer-songwriter Dan Bern and Mike Viola (of the Candy Butchers) wrote most of the film's songs, including "There's a Change A' Happenin'", "The Mulatto Song" and "Hole in My Pants". Marshall Crenshaw wrote the title tune and Van Dyke Parks penned one of the 1960-styled psychedelic jams, "Black Sheep".

Singer Angela Correa provides the voice of Darlene Madison Cox (played in the film by actress Jenna Fischer), as she did in the feature film.

A number of critics noted the unusually high quality of many of the individual songs on the soundtrack, how well they reflected the styles and times they were attempting to spoof, and how well they stood on their own as quality compositions. The soundtrack was nominated for both a Grammy and Golden Globe Award and was nominated and won the Sierra Award for Best Song in a Motion Picture from the Las Vegas Film Critics Society.

Track listing
All tracks performed by John C. Reilly, except where noted. All tracks produced by Michael Andrews and Jake Kasdan.

iTunes exclusive extended edition
"Take My Hand" (Reilly)
"Jump Little Children" (Craig Robinson)
"(Mama) You Got to Love Your Negro Man" (Reilly)
"That's Amore" (Reilly)
"Walk Hard" (Reilly)
"A Life Without You (Is No Life At All)" (Reilly)
"(I Hate You) Big Daddy" (Reilly)
"Walk Hard (Punk Version)" (Reilly)
"Let's Duet" (Reilly & Angela Correa)
"Darling" (Reilly)
"Guilty As Charged" (Reilly)
"There's a Change A' Happening (I Can Feel It)" (Reilly)
"Dear Mr. President" (Reilly)
"Hey Mr. Old Guy" (Reilly)
"Ladies First" (Reilly)
"The Mulatto Song" (Reilly)
"Let Me Hold You (Little Man)" (Reilly)
"Hole In My Pants" (Reilly)
"Royal Jelly" (Reilly)
"Farmer Glickstein" (Reilly)
"Black Sheep" (Reilly)
"Walk Hard (70's TV Show Theme)" (Reilly)
"Who Wants to Party" (Reilly)
"Weeping On the Inside" (Reilly)
"Billy Don't Be a Hero" (Reilly)
"Walk Hard (All-Star Version)" (Ghostface Killah, Lyle Lovett, Jewel Kilcher, Jackson Browne)
"Beautiful Ride" (Reilly)
"(Have You Heard the News) Dewey Cox Died" (Reilly)
"Cut My Brother In Half Blues" (Reilly)
"(You Make Me So) Hard" (Jacques Slade)
 The song "Starman" is not available on the iTunes Exclusive Extended Edition of the album.

Release history
  October 30, 2007
  November 8, 2007
  November 5, 2007
   December 3, 2007
   December 4, 2007
  January 7, 2008
   January 16, 2008
  March 6, 2008
  February 17, 2008
  March 7, 2008
   April 9, 2008
  April 17, 2008
   May 19, 2008

References

2007 soundtrack albums
Columbia Records soundtracks
Comedy rock soundtracks
Comedy film soundtracks
Rockabilly soundtracks